Colonial Inn may refer to:

Colonial Inn (Ogunquit, Maine)
Concord's Colonial Inn, Concord, Massachusetts

See also
Colonial Hotel (disambiguation)